Abdullah Al-Saleh (born 15 January 1988) is a Saudi professional footballer who plays as a goalkeeper. He last played for Saudi Arabian club Al-Ettifaq.

References

Living people
1988 births
Saudi Arabian footballers
People from Al-Hasa
Association football goalkeepers
Al-Adalah FC players
Ettifaq FC players
Saudi Second Division players
Saudi First Division League players
Saudi Professional League players
Saudi Arabian Shia Muslims